Keith "K. J." Brent (born August 6, 1993) is a former American football wide receiver. He played college football at Wake Forest, and was signed by the Oakland Raiders as an undrafted free agent in 2016.

College career
During his collegiate career, Brent played one year at Wake Forest University after playing three years at University of South Carolina. He graduated from South Carolina with a degree in Hotel, Restaurant, and Tourism Management.

Professional career

Oakland Raiders
Brent signed with the Oakland Raiders as an undrafted free agent on May 10, 2016. He was waived on September 3, 2016 and was signed to the practice squad the next day. He signed a reserve/future contract with the Raiders on January 9, 2017.

On September 2, 2017, Brent was waived by the Raiders.

Seattle Seahawks
On September 27, 2017, Brent was signed to the Seattle Seahawks' practice squad. He was released by the team a few days later.

Indianapolis Colts
On October 24, 2017, Brent was signed to the Indianapolis Colts' practice squad. He was promoted to the active roster on December 2, 2017.

On September 1, 2018, Brent was waived/injured by the Colts and was placed on injured reserve. He was released on September 6, 2018. He was re-signed to the practice squad on October 16, 2018, but was released three days later.

Tampa Bay Buccaneers
On December 4, 2018, Brent was signed to the Tampa Bay Buccaneers practice squad.

Brent signed a reserve/future contract with the Buccaneers on December 31, 2018. He was waived/injured during final roster cuts on August 30, 2019, and reverted to the team's injured reserve list on September 1. He was released on October 9.

References

External links
Oakland Raiders bio
Wake Forest Demon Deacons bio
South Carolina Gamecocks bio
Indianapolis Colts bio

1993 births
Living people
People from Waxhaw, North Carolina
Players of American football from North Carolina
American football wide receivers
South Carolina Gamecocks football players
Wake Forest Demon Deacons football players
Oakland Raiders players
Seattle Seahawks players
Indianapolis Colts players
Tampa Bay Buccaneers players